Estanislao Struway Samaniego (born 25 June 1968) is a Paraguayan football coach and former midfielder from who was nicknamed Taní during his career. He is the current coach of División Intermedia team Sportivo Iteño.

Club
At club level Struway spent most of his career in Paraguay where he won five league titles. He also played at professional level in Argentina, Peru and Brazil. His first club was Cerro Porteño where he made his debut in 1988, he won two Paraguayan league titles in his first spell with the club in 1990 and 1992.

Struway joined Argentine Racing Club de Avellaneda in 1995 but never settled, he joined 2nd division Los Andes the next season. In 1996, he played for Sporting Cristal in Peru.

Struway played in Brazil in the late 1990s, making appearances for Portuguesa and Coritiba. In the former, he protagonized an unusual episode during a Campeonato Brasileiro match: learning that he would be substituted, Struway angrily took off his shirt and threw it on the ground, resulting in him getting sent off instead.

In 1999, he returned to Cerro Porteño where he won another Paraguayan league title in 2001. In 2002, he moved to Libertad where he was part of two more league championship winning campaigns. He spent his last years playing for 12 de Octubre and then Sportivo Iteño before his retirement in 2005.

International 
Struway made his international debut for the Paraguay national football team on 27 February 1991 in a friendly match against Brazil (1-1). He obtained a total number of 74 international caps, scoring four goals for the national side. He played in the 2002 FIFA World Cup and in five editions of the Copa América: 1991, 1993, 1995, 1997 and 2001

Honours

Club
 Cerro Porteño
 Paraguayan Primera División: 1990, 1992, 2001
 Sporting Cristal
 Peruvian Primera División: 1996
 Coritiba
 Campeonato Paranaense: 1999
 Libertad
 Paraguayan Primera División: 2002, 2003

References

External links
International statistics at rsssf

1968 births
Living people
Paraguayan footballers
Club Libertad footballers
Cerro Porteño players
Racing Club de Avellaneda footballers
Club Atlético Los Andes footballers
Associação Portuguesa de Desportos players
Coritiba Foot Ball Club players
Sporting Cristal footballers
Paraguay international footballers
2002 FIFA World Cup players
Expatriate footballers in Argentina
Expatriate footballers in Brazil
Expatriate footballers in Peru
1991 Copa América players
1993 Copa América players
1995 Copa América players
1997 Copa América players
2001 Copa América players
Association football midfielders
Paraguayan football managers
Paraguayan people of English descent
12 de Octubre Football Club managers